The Challenge: Double Agents is the thirty-sixth season of the MTV reality competition series The Challenge. This season features alumni from The Real World, Road Rules, The Challenge, Are You the One?, Big Brother, the Olympics, Love Island UK, The Amazing Race, Survivor, Geordie Shore, Ex on the Beach, Shipwrecked, America's Got Talent, WWE NXT, and Ultimate Beastmaster competing for a share at a $1 million prize. The season premiered on December 9, 2020. A launch special, titled "The Challenge: Double Agents Declassified" aired on December 7, 2020.

Contestants

Format

Double Agents features a main challenge, a nomination process, and an elimination round. This season had players competing in male-female teams of two, initially selected among themselves at the conclusion of the opening challenge. These teams frequently changed throughout the season due to the nature of the game. 
Daily Challenge: Players compete in a main challenge in pairs, where the winning team forms the Double Agents.
Nominations:  Players, besides the Double Agents, participate in nominations and must vote for one pair to participate in the elimination round. They are given a chance to discuss the nominations before voting  privately and as individuals. The team who receives the most votes are "compromised" and  will have the player of the designated gender compete in the elimination round. 
Double Agents: Following nominations, the Double Agents are shown the nominated team, as well as which individuals voted for them. At the Crater, the Double Agents vote for a second team to compete against the nominated team in the elimination round, where the player of the designated gender will participate. The Double Agents may also volunteer for elimination instead of voting for a team. 
Eliminations (The Crater): Following the Double Agent's votes, the gender that participates in the elimination round is disclosed. The player of the designated gender of the nominated team competes in an elimination round against the same-gender player of the team selected by the Double Agents, or the volunteer from the Double Agents. The loser is eliminated while the winner receives a Gold Skull and remains in the game. Additionally, the winner is given the choice between remaining with their current partner, or selecting any player of the opposite gender to become their new partner excluding the Double Agents.

Twists
Gold Skull: Similar to the "Red Skull" from Total Madness, winning an elimination round earns a player a Gold Skull, a requirement to compete in the Final Challenge. Unique to this season, there are only 10 skulls available - five for each gender. Once all five skulls are obtained for a gender, the only way to attain a skull is to defeat a player possessing a skull in elimination.
Rogue Agents: A player without a partner at any point in the game is classified as a Rogue Agent. Rogue Agents do not compete in the next daily challenge and are ineligible to be selected for elimination. Once a player of the opposite gender also becomes a Rogue Agent, the two contestants form a new team and compete as usual.
Infiltration: The winner of an elimination round may select any player of the opposite gender (excluding the Double Agents) to become their partner. In the event that a player in an existing pair is chosen, their former partner either chooses a new partner between the remaining agents without a partner, pairs up with the agent without a partner, or becomes a Rogue Agent, depending on numbers. 
Security Breach: Two "Security Breach" twists were enacted throughout the season. 
Reactivated Agent: In Episode 5, eliminated contestant Ashley Mitchell returned to the competition due to the number of female medical disqualifications.
Double Elimination: In Episode 11/12, a Double Male Elimination occurred in which two male players were eliminated. The two teams that received the most votes during nominations were compromised. The Double Agents then had to vote two teams into the Crater to compete against the compromised teams, or could volunteer against either compromised team.

Gameplay

Challenge games
Decryption: Played in male and female heats, contestants race up a volcanic mound to reach a capsule with a color code encrypted on it. They must memorize the code before returning to their station and duplicating the sequence, by connecting colored wires. The first player in each heat to correctly duplicate the sequence and detonate their station wins, however, the individual with the fastest overall time earns the ability to select their partner and become the Double Agents.
Winners: Aneesa & Fessy
Ice Spy: Teams swim through glacial water towards a boat to retrieve a block of ice with a "kill" capsule frozen inside, before returning to shore. They must remove the kill from the ice using an ice pick, and can place the kill in another team's station. Once a team receives three kills, they are eliminated from the challenge, however, they can still place the kill they currently possess. The last team standing wins.
Winners: Aneesa & Fessy
Road Kill: Played two teams at a time, teams begin on the back of a moving truck. They must push their opponent of the same gender off the truck and onto the surrounding safety nets without timing out. The last player with any body part still on the platform wins the matchup for their team. The team that pushes both opponents off the truck the fastest wins the mission.
Winners: Kaycee & Leroy
Drone Control: Played two teams at a time, one teammate wears a VR headset connected to the camera of a drone. They must direct their partner, who flies the drone using a controller, towards a number code at the opposite end of the tunnel. Once they obtain the sequence, the player wearing the headset must solve a binary puzzle before entering the code into a tablet. There is a ten-minute time limit before teams time out. The team with the fastest time wins.
Winners: Devin & Tori
Agent Down: Played in two heats of six teams, the female partners begin harnessed on a ledge on the side of a platform while their male partner begins on top of the platform. The male players must pull 200 metres of rope out of the platform before they can hold onto their partner. The ledge drops after an undisclosed period, however, the females can still hold the platform to avoid falling if their partner has not finished pulling the rope. The team that holds on the longest wins.
Winners: Big T & CT
Smuggle Run: Teams carry a heavy cylindrical capsule on their shoulders and complete a five-mile race. Along the way, they must use their capsule to climb over a wall and solve a magic hexagon puzzle before reaching the finish line. The first team to cross the finish line wins. In addition to becoming the Double Agents, the winners also receive a cash prize of $6,000 each and a P3 Portable Protein reward.
Winners: Jay & Theresa
Aerial Takedown: Played in male and female heats of five players. Players begin on a cargo net being dragged by a helicopter, and must push their opponents off the net into the water below without timing out. The player who pushes all their opponents off the cargo net first wins the heat, however, the player who achieves this the fastest wins for their team and becomes the Double Agents.
Winners: Kaycee & Leroy
All Brawl: Played in three phases, each phase requires players to enter a mud-pit and obtain an X-shaped relic. The winners of each phase advance to the next phase. The team that wins the third phase wins and becomes the Double Agents.
In Phase One, five players of the same gender at a time enter the pit and must find the relic in the mud, escape the pit and cross the finish line with the relic to advance.
In Phase Two, the heat winners of the same gender from Phase One must wrestle the relic away from their opponent and bring the relic out of the mud-pit to advance.
In Phase Three, the individual winners from Phase Two and their partners must wrestle the relic out of their opponent's hands, where competitors face-off against their opponent of the same gender. The team that has both players win their individual matchup wins.
Winners: Kam & Kyle
Interrogation: Played in two heats, with each heat containing of one member of each team. Players begin standing on a platform above water, holding onto an overhead bar. One at a time, they are asked a true-or-false trivia question. If they answer correctly, they must select another player to have their bar tilt forward, making it more difficult to hold on. However, if they answer incorrectly, their own bar tilts forward. Players are eliminated if they fall in the water or hold onto the side of the apparatus. The last player standing wins their heat, while the player who answers the most questions correctly, or holds on the longest, wins for their team. In addition to becoming the Double Agents, the winners also receive a cash prize of $5,000 each.
Winners: Amber B. & Darrell
Black Sand Ops: Teams search through a field of one hundred torches to find their colored puzzle pieces buried underneath ten of the torches. If they dig up another team’s puzzle piece, they can either leave it unburied, or rebury the piece. Once they find all ten pieces, they must use the pieces to assemble an Icelandic totem by replicating a provided answer key. The first team to correctly assemble their totem wins.
Winners: Devin & Gabby
Air Lift: Played one team at a time, teams begin on the bow of a moving speedboat and grab onto ropes attached to a flying helicopter. They must hold onto the ropes until the helicopter reaches a drop-zone, before dropping into the water. Once in the water, teams swim towards a platform and press the button on top. Teams are disqualified if they are unable to grab a rope, or fall into the water prior to reaching the drop-zone. The team with the fastest time wins. 
Winners: Big T & CT
Survive the Night: Teams begin handcuffed together and locked in a cell. They must complete a series of tasks to unlock their handcuffs and escape. The first team to escape their cell wins. 
 Task 1: Hold a heavy "bomb" for two hours.
 Task 2: Consume an entire tray of ram's testicles and fermented shark to find a message printed on the tray: "Solve the equation on the back". 
 Task 3: Flip the tray over to find a math equation, the solution of the equation forms the code to unlock a box containing hammers.
 Task 4: Use the hammers to break through cinder blocks and search for a key, which unlocks team's handcuffs.
 Task 5: Scratch a blackboard to reveal a clue: "The key to your freedom lies underneath".
 Task 6: Dig through the dirt floor of the cell to find two hand files.
 Task 7: Use the files to unlock the cell and escape.
Winners: Kaycee & Leroy
Undercover: Teams must dive underwater, in between two tectonic plates, until they reach a line which stretches across the water. They must pull themselves along the line to collect six coded rings at the end before returning to the coding station at the start. Teams are disqualified if either player returns to the surface for air prior to collecting all six rings. Once teams return to the coding station, they must use the rings to decipher a six-letter code. The team with the fastest time wins. 
Winners: Aneesa & Kyle
Spy Dive: Played three teams at a time, each player must complete a tandem skydive from a plane and memorise a puzzle key that can be seen as they fall. Once all teams land, they must run half a mile across a field to their puzzle station, before assembling the puzzle by replicating the key they viewed. Teams may only begin assembling the puzzle once both team members reach the puzzle station. The first team to finish wins their heat, however the team with the fastest overall time wins and becomes the Double Agents. 
Winners: Kaycee & Leroy
Global Domination: Played in two rounds, with each three teams playing offense and two teams playing defense each round. Teams must enter a giant metal sphere; blue spheres represent defensive teams and silver spheres represent offensive teams. During their round as offense, teams roll down a ramp, onto a battleground and over as many targets as possible while the defense teams try to prevent them from doing so. Once the time limit expires, teams switch positions and the second round commences. The team that rolls over the most targets wins.
Winners: Kaycee & Leroy
Escape the Volcano: In the morning, each team elects one member to leave the house and, unbeknownst to them, be transported to the crater of a volcano for the challenge. They are chained to the ground and given a briefcase. Their teammate must later undergo a five-mile race to the entrance of the volcano, solving two math problems along the way.  At the volcano entrance, they must descend to their partner and unlock them before both team members return to the start. Once teams return to the start, they must use the pieces in the briefcase to solve a puzzle. The first team to solve the puzzle wins.
Winners: Cory & Kam

Crater games
Fire Escape: Players are suspended by their wrists and ankles under a metal beam, and have to maneuver their way from one side of the beam to the other before returning to the start. The first player to return to the start wins. In its second and third appearances, the length of the beam is doubled and the number of obstacles on the beam is tripled.
Played by: Ashley vs. Natalie, Jay vs. Leroy, Aneesa vs. Big T
Ring of Spies: Players begin at the center of the Crater with both hands on a metal ring. They must wrestle the ring away from their opponent and place it on their post. The first player to place the ring on their post twice wins. In its second appearance, players begin on opposite sides of the Crater and must race to retrieve the ring which is suspended at the center, before placing it on their post.
Played by: Joseph vs. Kyle, Gabby vs. Nany
Snapping Point: Players begin with a rope hooked to their backs which attaches them to their opponent. They must run around three posts to reach a button. The first player to press the button wins. In its second appearance, players are attached to their opponent by a rope and begin facing opposite directions. They must collect three rings before placing them on posts at the boundary of the Crater. The first player to place a ring on all three posts wins. In its third appearance, the game returned to its first appearance, with the size of the rope doubled and the resistance tripled. The first player to press the button twice wins.
Played by: Devin vs. Wes, Kaycee vs. Theresa, Cory vs. Darrell
Hall Brawl: In its first, third and fourth appearances, players must run through a narrow hallway, past their opponent and press a button at the opposite end. The player who pushes the button first twice (or three times in its fourth appearance) wins. In its second appearance, players must run through the hallway to collect a ball at the opposite end. They must then return through the hallway and place the ball in their bucket, repeating this process three times. The first player to retrieve all three balls wins. 
Played by: Fessy vs. Nelson, Amber B. vs. Amber M., Amber B. vs. Big T, Fessy vs. Kyle
Asset Destruction: Players pull a crate full of 'bombs' across the Crater and tip the crate over at the end to release the bombs. Once released, they must throw the bombs at a wall of targets. Only 13 of the 25 targets are breakable while the remaining 12 are solid. The first player to hit all 13 targets wins. In its second appearance called Asset Destruction II, players must solve a sliding puzzle that reveals the locations of the breakable targets prior to pulling the crate. Additionally, the crate and bombs inside are heavier and only 7 of the 25 targets are breakable. 
Played by: Aneesa vs. Tori, Josh vs. Mechie
Dead Ringer: Players begin harnessed on top of a platform with six metal rings. They must generate momentum to swing and place the rings on hooks attached to the surrounding poles. If they drop any rings, they must use all their remaining rings before being allowed to collect them. The first player to hook all six rings wins. In its second appearance, players swing and collect seven puzzle pieces which are higher and further away. Once they collect all seven puzzle pieces, they must return to their puzzle station and solve the tangram puzzle. The first player to solve the puzzle wins.
Played by: Ashley vs. Kam, Darrell vs. Devin, CT vs. Josh

Final Challenge

Day one
First Leg: Teams must complete a three-mile run across Iceland’s undulating terrain to reach the first checkpoint.
Checkpoint 1 (Decryption): Once each pair arrives at the checkpoint, it is announced they would compete in a revisit of the opening challenge. Played in male and female heats, players must race up a volcanic mound to reach a capsule with a color code encrypted on it. They must memorize the code and return to their station to duplicate the sequence by connecting colored wires. The player with the fastest time from either heat wins and earns the opportunity to infiltrate any team and select a new partner.
Winner: Amber B.
Second Leg: Teams must complete a two-mile run along Iceland’s coastline to collect a key, before proceeding to the next checkpoint. Teams begin in intervals based on the order and time they completed the First Leg.
Checkpoint 2: Teams use their key to unlock their station and consume a plate of fish eyes, sheep heart, sheep face and ram testicles. Additionally, they must each drink a litre of blood. The first team to finish wins and must assign a "Sabotage Plate" of sheep organs and another litre of blood for a remaining team to consume in addition to the contents of the checkpoint. Once complete, teams proceed to their next checkpoint on shore. The last team to reach the next checkpoint is eliminated.
Winners: Amber B. & CT
Eliminated: Fessy & Kaycee (4th place)
Checkpoint 3: Teams kayak across the water towards a puzzle station, collecting puzzle pieces at a designated coastline along the way. Once they reach the puzzle station, teams must use the pieces to assemble an Icelandic totem before running to their next checkpoint inside an ice cave. 
Checkpoint 4: Teams must solve a math equation using numbers from a number board. While each player is given their own equation, the checkpoint is completed once one team member correctly solves their equation. The first player to solve the equation from the winning pair wins and earns the ability to infiltrate any team and select a new partner.
Winner: CT
Overnight Stage: Teams are provided a bed and must spend the night in the ice cave. The first team to complete the previous checkpoint is given a waterproof sleeping bag, the second team is given a duvet with a waterproof cover, while the third team is given a blanket. One team member may sleep at a time, while their partner must stand and hold a capsule. If teams wish to switch places, the player holding the capsule must first submerge their face in a tub of glacial water.

Day two
Checkpoint 5: Teams race up a glacier to collect two pickaxes and use them to retrieve a capsule frozen inside a block of ice. Once obtained, teams follow a marked path to their next checkpoint. The first team to complete the previous day's checkpoint have a five-minute headstart while the second team have a two-minute headstart.
Checkpoint 6: Teams find a code inside their capsule that they decode using a provided puzzle key at their coding station, before continuing along the path. They must leave the capsule at a designated point and may not bring the code with them to the coding station.
Checkpoint 7: Teams must solve a tangram puzzle before proceeding along an elevating path to the peak of a mountain where the finish is located. The first team to reach the mountain peak are declared the winners of Double Agents.
Winners: Amber B. & CT — $900,000 ($450,000 each)
Runners-up: Cory & Kam — $100,000 ($50,000 each)
Third place: Leroy & Nany

Game summary

Elimination progress

Competition
 The contestant finished the final challenge and won
 The contestant finished the final challenge and lost
 The contestant did not finish the final challenge and was disqualified
 The contestant's team won the daily challenge
 The contestant was not selected for the Crater
 The contestant's teammate was nominated for the Crater
 The contestant was a Rogue Agent, did not have a partner or compete in the daily challenge, and was exempt from being voted into the Crater
 The contestant won in the Crater and earned a Gold Skull
 The contestant was a Double Agent, volunteered for the Crater, won and earned a Gold Skull
 The contestant lost in the Crater and was eliminated
 The contestant was removed from the competition due to medical reasons
 The contestant withdrew from the competition

Team progress

 Teams at the start of each episode

Gold Skull progress

 Gold Skull holder at the end of each episode
 The Gold Skull was stolen after the contestant possessing it lost in the Crater and was eliminated from the competition
 The Gold Skull was recycled after the contestant possessing it was removed from the competition due to medical reasons

Voting progress

Bold indicates the team was voted in by the Double Agents

Episodes

Reunion special
The two-part reunion special aired on April 28 and May 5, 2021 and was hosted by former NFL player Vernon Davis. The cast members who attended the reunion were CT, Nany, Kam, Cory, Leroy, Amber B., Kaycee, Josh, Devin, Tori, Aneesa, Fessy, Jay, Ashley, and Amber M. Big T, Kyle, Nelson, Nam, Gabby and Darrell also appeared via satellite.

Impact of the COVID-19 pandemic
Double Agents was filmed in Iceland amid the COVID-19 pandemic, where precautions took place to ensure the safety of the cast and production. Both cast and crew were tested for COVID-19 every three days and were required to undergo quarantine prior to the filming of the season. Preparation for the show took production over ten months (longer than most other seasons) and filming locations were scouted virtually due to international travel restrictions. While the international crew occupied a hotel, hired Icelandic locals would instead return home at the end of the day to maintain a bubble, and were kept separate from the cast through a tiered system represented by colored bands. Showrunner Emer Harkin revealed that production was required to wear PPE and remain six-feet apart from cast members. Harkin also revealed that unlike other seasons, where the cast recreated at local venues between challenges, an on-premise club separate to the house was built as an alternative to maintain the filming bubble. During the nine weeks that the season filmed for, none of the 3,000 conducted COVID-19 tests returned positive.

Notes

References

External links
 

2020 American television seasons
2021 American television seasons
Double Agents, The Challenge
Television shows set in Iceland
Television shows filmed in Iceland
Television series impacted by the COVID-19 pandemic